Upton is a civil parish north-east of Kislingbury and south-west of Dallington, in Northamptonshire, England about  west of Northampton town centre along the A4500 road. Formerly a scattered hamlet, it is now part of the town. The area west of Northampton is now a major area of expansion of the town and named Upton after the parish.

Demographics
The 2011 census, shows the parish's population was 1720 people.

Governance
It is currently part of the Upton Ward of Northampton Borough Council and the Sixfields Division of Northamptonshire County Council.

History
The name 'Upton' means 'Higher farm/settlement'. The village is both on a hill and is higher up the River Nene than Northampton.

Upton Hall

James Harington, the author of The Commonwealth of Oceana, which found little favour with Oliver Cromwell, was born in Upton Hall in 1611. He wrote the book in the nearby village of Milton Malsor. Harington's mother was Jane Samwell (or Samuell) of Upton, daughter of Sir William Samwell. The Samwells bought the hall in 1600 from the Knightley family of Fawsley who had owned the hall since 1419. Most of the hall's appearance today is due to the Samwells. However, a late medieval roof remains above the hall ceiling. The front of the hall is 17th century. Sir Thomas Samwell's initials are on a rainwater head dated 1748. The Hall is a Grade I listed building. There are interesting family pictures and fine plasterwork dating from 1737. Also notable is the carved roof with late medieval tombers and the ballroom. The building is not open to the public except occasionally when Northampton Borough Council organise a heritage open day, usually a weekend in September.

A girls boarding and day school was started in Upton Hall by the Misses Teape in 1946 and given the name Upton Hall School. All three ladies were very elderly when they retired in 1963 and the school was bought and a mammoth task taken on by Mrs Christine Macdonald, headmistress, and Mr Archibald Macdonald, bursar and estate manager. Mr and Mrs Macdonald cared very much for the school and the buildings and spent the summer of 1963 bringing its rooms back to a good condition and creating décor more suitable for girls in the nineteen sixties . They were helped by Mr Browning, driver and handyman, who notably at the age of 74 painted the whole of the 18th century two storey ballroom single handed. It was painted in the traditional colouring of pale green and white as can be seen in the photographs of the current school.
Archie Macdonald, known in the UK as Mac, used his knowledge of horticulture to make the three acre walled garden into a productive fruit and vegetable garden, with the help of the resident gardener and two garden lads. Amongst other things he created asparagus beds and strawberry patches. What wasn't given to the girls to eat was traded in locally for other veg. The girls suddenly found their diet was changed beyond recognition. Mac went on to use the wonderful Victorian greenhouses to grow tomatoes on an impressive scale using the ring culture method. This was also pretty successful and many trips were taken to swap in the surplus tomatoes.

In 1964 a visitor arrived at Upton Hall School with a copy of Pevsner's Buildings of England in hand asking if he could see inside the Hall and particularly to see the roof space. This visitor was Viscount Althorp, later to become the 8th Earl Spencer, who of course lived at the beautiful Althorp about 6 miles from Upton Hall. The Viscount was given a tour and tea and left very pleased to have seen the medieval roof which in those days was known probably quite incorrectly as the monks room! It was a tricky place to visit as there was a story of a young lad stepping between the beams and falling through the ballroom ceiling. The small wooden entrance door was kept firmly padlocked and the name, the sad tale and the cobwebs helped give this part of the house a marvellous sense of mystery. Not all who got to peek in the door had the courage to enter.

Quinton House School, an independent school for 2-18 year olds, now occupies Upton Hall buildings including a modern sports hall.

St Michael's Church

The church is adjacent to the school and alongside the busy A45 road and is Norman, and Norman windows survive. The tower is 14th century. There is a monument to Sir Richard Knightley (d.1537) and a memorial tablet to Thomas Samwell Watson Samwell (d.1835).

Saxon building

West of the church are the remains of a  6th or 7th century Saxon timber building, excavated in 1965.

References

(Google Maps)

External links

Villages in Northamptonshire
Areas of Northampton
Civil parishes in Northamptonshire